Tabynskoye (Tabın) is a rural locality (a selo) and the administrative centre of Tabynsky Selsoviet, Gafuriysky District, Bashkortostan, Russia. The population was 1,827 as of 2010. There are 29 streets.

Geography 
Tabynskoye is located 13 km northwest of Krasnousolsky (the district's administrative centre) by road. Kuzma-Alexandrovka is the nearest rural locality.

References 

Rural localities in Gafuriysky District